Euerdorf is a municipality in the district of Bad Kissingen in Bavaria, Germany.

Geography
Euerdorf lies in the Main-Rhön region at the confluence of Sulzbach and the Franconian Saale.

Divisions of the municipality
The municipality is divided into the following towns:
Euerdorf
Wirmsthal

History
With secularization of the government in 1803, the territory of the present municipality became part of Bavaria. In the Treaty of Pressburg between France and Austria in 1805, the lands of the Bishop of Würzburg were given to Ferdinand III, Grand Duke of Tuscany, and he was made Grand Duke of Würzburg, a new state, as a reward for his support of Napoleon. These lands then again became part of Bavaria in 1814 (this time permanently) at the defeat of Napoleon.

Population

Government

The municipal council has 13 members, including the mayor. Of these members, in 2002, 6 were CSU, 4 were independent, and 3 were Bürgerblock.

Coat of arms
In silver on a green frame, two grapevines with red stakes, each with two gold clusters of grapes and two green leaves.

Economy
In 1998, Euerdorf had 12 agricultural businesses, 175 manufacturers, and 174 commercial establishments.

In 1999, 577 ha of land were in agricultural use, 501 ha in fields and 67 ha in pasture.

Transportation
Euerdorf has a train station on the Franconian Saaletalbahn that runs from Gemünden am Main to Bad Kissingen. Shuttles run every hour to Schweinfurt, and on workdays two trains of the Deutsche Bahn run daily to Würzburg.

References

Bad Kissingen (district)